Thomas Prager (born 13 September 1985) is an Austrian footballer who plays as a midfielder for Wiener Viktoria.

Club career
Prager was lured away by Heerenveen from FC Stadlau and played 5 years for the Frisians but never managed to claim a regular spot in the starting line-up. He did not feature in the 2008–09 plans of Heerenveen manager Trond Sollied and was transferred to LASK Linz.
In the summer of 2010, he was signed transfer free by FC Luzern. On 1 July 2011, he was loaned to Austrian club SK Rapid Wien for one year, with the option of a further year.

International career
He made his debut for Austria on 23 May, 2006 in a 4-1 friendly defeat against Croatia but was left out of the EURO 2008 squad. He has earned 14 caps, scoring one goal.

References

External links
 Profile – SC Heerenveen
 Eredivisie stats – Voetbal International
 

1985 births
Living people
Austrian footballers
Austria international footballers
Austria youth international footballers
Austria under-21 international footballers
Eredivisie players
Austrian Football Bundesliga players
Swiss Super League players
Cypriot First Division players
Cypriot Second Division players
SC Heerenveen players
LASK players
FC Luzern players
SK Rapid Wien players
Ethnikos Achna FC players
Austrian expatriate footballers
Austrian expatriate sportspeople in Switzerland
Expatriate footballers in the Netherlands
Expatriate footballers in Switzerland
Expatriate footballers in Cyprus
People from Donaustadt
Footballers from Vienna
Association football midfielders